Common Modular Platform (CMP) is a modular car platform which is jointly developed and used by French car manufacturer PSA Group (merged into Stellantis since 2021) and Chinese car manufacturer Dongfeng. Debuted in 2018 with the release of the DS 3 Crossback, the platform is mainly used by B-segment (supermini or subcompact) vehicles along with some entry level C-segment vehicles. For larger cars from the C-segment above, PSA/Stellantis uses the EMP2 platform.

The CMP offers a high level of modularity with a choice of two track widths, three wheelbase lengths, three rear modules and the capability to offer several wheel diameters, allowing engineers and designers to provide to introduce broad range of body styles, from hatchbacks and saloons to SUVs.

In 2015, it was reported that both PSA and Dongfeng would spend  on the platform project with 60 percent of the expenditure committed by PSA, with the remaining 40 percent from Dongfeng. A team of Dongfeng engineers was part of the project team based at PSA's main R&D centre in Velizy, south of Paris.

Applications

CMP 
Vehicles using platform (calendar years):
 Citroën C4 III (2020–present)
 Citroën C4 X (2022–present)
 Citroën C3 (CC21) (2022–present, India/Brazil)
 Dongfeng Fengshen/Aeolus Yixuan (2019–present)
 Dongfeng Fengshen/Aeolus Yixuan GS (2020–present)
 DS 3 Crossback (2018–present)
 Jeep Avenger (2022)
 Opel Corsa F (2019–present)
 Opel Mokka B (2020–present)
 Peugeot 208 II (2019–present)
 Peugeot 2008 II (2019–present)

eCMP 
The CMP is also designed for battery electric vehicle under the name eCMP, which can be produced in the same assembly line. The first-generation eCMP are equipped with a  electric motor, a 50 kWh lithium-ion battery pack and a high-performance heat pump.

Vehicles using platform (calendar years):
 Citroën ë-C4 (2020–present)
 Citroën ë-C4 X (2022–present)
 Dongfeng Fengshen/Aeolus Yixuan EV (2019–present)
 DS 3 Crossback E-Tense (2019–present)
 Opel Corsa-e (2019–present)
 Opel Mokka-e (2020–present)
 Peugeot e-208 (2020–present)
 Peugeot e-2008 (2019–present)

STLA Small 
The STLA Small is an updated version of the eCMP.

Vehicles using platform (calendar years):

 Jeep Avenger EV (2022)

See also 

 List of Stellantis platforms
 List of PSA platforms
 List of Fiat platforms
 List of Chrysler platforms

References

PSA platforms